Mendip is a local government district of Somerset in England. The Mendip district covers a largely rural area of  ranging from the Mendip Hills through on to the Somerset Levels. It has a population of approximately 110,000. The administrative centre of the district is Shepton Mallet but the largest town (with more than twice the population of Shepton Mallet) is Frome.

A scheduled monument is a nationally important archaeological site or monument which is given legal protection by being placed on a list (or "schedule") by the Secretary of State for Culture, Media and Sport; Historic England takes the leading role in identifying such sites. The legislation governing this is the Ancient Monuments and Archaeological Areas Act 1979. The term "monument" can apply to the whole range of archaeological sites, and they are not always visible above ground. Such sites have to have been deliberately constructed by human activity. They range from prehistoric standing stones and burial sites, through Roman remains and medieval structures such as castles and monasteries, to later structures such as industrial sites and buildings constructed for the World Wars or the Cold War.

There are 234 scheduled monuments in Mendip. These include a large number of bowl and round barrows and other neolithic, Bronze and Iron Age tumuli such as the Priddy Circles and Priddy Nine Barrows and Ashen Hill Barrow Cemeteries. There are also several Iron Age hill forts on the hill tops and lake villages on the lowlands such as Meare and Glastonbury Lake Villages. The lake villages were often connected by timber trackways such as the Sweet Track. There are several Roman sites particularly around the Charterhouse Roman Town and lead mining. Some later coal mining sites are also included in the list.

Two major religious sites in Mendip at Glastonbury Abbey and Wells Cathedral and their precincts and dispersed residences, tithe barns and The Abbot's Fish House, are included in the list. Prehistoric defensive features such as Ponter's Ball Dyke were supplemented in the medieval period by motte-and-bailey castles such as Farleigh Hungerford, Nunney and Fenny Castle. Commercial and industrial development is represented by the Old Iron Works at Mells and various market crosses. The most recent site on the list is a World War II bombing decoy complex and anti-aircraft obstructions, which were built in 1940, on Black Down, the highest point of the Mendip Hills. The monuments are listed below using the titles given in the Historic England data sheets.

Monuments

|- class="vcard without_image"
! scope="row" class="fn org" | An area of the Romano-British linear village at Fosse Lane, Shepton Mallet
| class="label" | Shepton Mallet || class="category" | Earthworks ||   || || Earthworks from a Romano-British village next to the Fosse Way.
| || style="vertical-align:center; text-align:center;"  || 

|- class="vcard with_image"
! scope="row" class="fn org" | Ashen Hill barrow cemetery: a group of eight round barrows 500 m southeast of Harptree Lodge
| class="label" | Priddy || class="category" | Round barrows ||   || || Priddy Nine Barrows and Ashen Hill Barrow Cemeteries are a collection of round barrows, dating from the Bronze Age. The barrows sit on crests of land at either end of a field in an area of the Mendip Hills with several Neolithic remains. They are assumed to be related to the Priddy Circles which lie  to the north. Ashen Hill consists of six bowl barrows and two bell barrows aligned east to west while Priddy Nine Barrows divided into one group of seven round barrows and another pair slightly separated from the others. Excavations in 1815 uncovered cremation burials and grave goods. A geophysical magnetometry survey suggested that there may have been three further barrows.
| || || 

|- class="vcard without_image"
! scope="row" class="fn org" | Badger Hole, Wookey
| class="label" | St Cuthbert Out || class="category" | Cave ||   || || Badger Hole is a dry cave on the slopes above the Wookey ravine near the Wookey Hole Caves resurgence and contain in situ cave sediments laid down during the Ice Age. Just outside the cave the foundations of a 1st century hut have been identified. These had been built on during the Roman era up to the end of the 4th century.
| || style="vertical-align:center; text-align:center;"  || 

|- class="vcard without_image"
! scope="row" class="fn org" | Barrow, 350 m east of Harptree Lodge
| class="label" | Chewton Mendip || class="category" | Bowl barrow ||   || || A bowl barrow close to Priddy Circles.
| || style="vertical-align:center; text-align:center;"  || 

|- class="vcard without_image"
! scope="row" class="fn org" | Beckery Chapel and cemetery (site of)
| class="label" | Glastonbury || class="category" | Cemetery ||   || || The site of a chapel, also known as St Brigid's Chapel, and medieval cemetery. The chapel was "in ruins" in 1791. Excavations in 1967 found the remains of 63 burials.
| || style="vertical-align:center; text-align:center;"  || 

|- class="vcard without_image"
! scope="row" class="fn org" | Bell barrow south of Blackwell Tyning Plantation
| || style="vertical-align:center; text-align:center;"  || 

|- class="vcard without_image"
! scope="row" class="fn org" | Bishop's palace
| class="label" | Wookey || class="category" | Bishop's Palace ||   || || Earthworks from a medieval Bishop's Palace first documented in 1224 which may have been built by Jocelin of Wells. New buildings were added in the 1550s which included the only building which still survives and is used as Court Farmhouse.
| || style="vertical-align:center; text-align:center;"  || 

|- class="vcard with_image"
! scope="row" class="fn org" | Bishop's Palace ruined portions, walls and well house
| class="label" | Wells || class="category" | Bishop's Palace ||   || || The Bishop's Palace and accompanying Bishops House is adjacent to Wells Cathedral and has been the home of the Bishops of the Diocese of Bath and Wells for 800 years. Building of the palace started around 1210 by Bishops Jocelin of Wells and Reginald Fitz Jocelin. The chapel and great hall were added by Bishop Robert Burnell between 1275 and 1292. The walls, gatehouse and moat were added in the 14th century by Bishop Ralph of Shrewsbury. The Bishops House was added in the 15th century by Bishop Thomas Beckington. The great hall later fell into disrepair and was partially demolished around 1830. The palace was originally surrounded by a medieval deer park. When the walls were built, streams were diverted to form the moat as a reservoir. In the 1820s, the grounds within the walls were planted and laid out as pleasure grounds by Bishop George Henry Law, who created a reflecting pond near the springs. Parts of the buildings are still used as a residence by the current bishop, however much of the palace is now used for public functions and as a tourist attraction.
| || || 

|- class="vcard with_image"
! scope="row" class="fn org" | Bishop's tithe barn
| class="label" | Wells || class="category" | Tithe barn ||   || || Local stone roughly squared, with Doulting ashlar dressings and a Westmorland slate roof. Royalist troops were quartered in the barn during the Bloody Assizes.
| || || 

|- class="vcard with_image"
! scope="row" class="fn org" | Bolter's Bridge, Hornblotton
| class="label" | Ditcheat || class="category" | Bridge ||   || || A medieval stone bridge, carrying a small road over the River Alham.
| || || 

|- class="vcard without_image"
! scope="row" class="fn org" | Bowl barrow 20 m northwest of Whitestown Farm
| || style="vertical-align:center; text-align:center;"  || 

|- class="vcard without_image"
! scope="row" class="fn org" | Bowl barrow 70 m east of Barrow House Farm
| || style="vertical-align:center; text-align:center;"  || 

|- class="vcard without_image"
! scope="row" class="fn org" | Bowl barrow 70 m northeast of King Down Farm
| || style="vertical-align:center; text-align:center;"  || 

|- class="vcard without_image"
! scope="row" class="fn org" | Bowl barrow 70 m northwest of Hill View
| || style="vertical-align:center; text-align:center;"  || 

|- class="vcard without_image"
! scope="row" class="fn org" | Bowl barrow 70 m west of Rowberrow Farm
| || style="vertical-align:center; text-align:center;"  || 

|- class="vcard without_image"
! scope="row" class="fn org" | Bowl barrow 90 m northeast of Hill View
| || style="vertical-align:center; text-align:center;"  || 

|- class="vcard with_image"
! scope="row" class="fn org" | Bowl barrow 100 m north east of Home Farm Cottage
| || || 

|- class="vcard without_image"
! scope="row" class="fn org" | Bowl barrow 120 m north west of Burnt Wood
| || style="vertical-align:center; text-align:center;"  || 

|- class="vcard without_image"
! scope="row" class="fn org" | Bowl barrow 130 m west of St Lawrence's Church
| || style="vertical-align:center; text-align:center;"  || 

|- class="vcard without_image"
! scope="row" class="fn org" | Bowl barrow 150 m north east of Victoria Farm
| || style="vertical-align:center; text-align:center;"  || 

|- class="vcard without_image"
! scope="row" class="fn org" | Bowl barrow 150 m southwest of King Down Farm
| || style="vertical-align:center; text-align:center;"  || 

|- class="vcard without_image"
! scope="row" class="fn org" | Bowl barrow 170 m south-east of Hunter's Lodge Inn
| || style="vertical-align:center; text-align:center;"  || 

|- class="vcard without_image"
! scope="row" class="fn org" | Bowl barrow 180 m southwest of Yoxter Farm
| || style="vertical-align:center; text-align:center;"  || 

|- class="vcard without_image"
! scope="row" class="fn org" | Bowl barrow 180 m west of Ubley Warren Farm
| || style="vertical-align:center; text-align:center;"  || 

|- class="vcard without_image"
! scope="row" class="fn org" | Bowl barrow 220 m south west of Ubley Hill Farmhouse
| || style="vertical-align:center; text-align:center;"  || 

|- class="vcard without_image"
! scope="row" class="fn org" | Bowl barrow 230 m north west of Hunter's Lodge Inn
| || style="vertical-align:center; text-align:center;"  || 

|- class="vcard without_image"
! scope="row" class="fn org" | Bowl barrow 250 m northeast of King Down Farm
| || style="vertical-align:center; text-align:center;"  || 

|- class="vcard without_image"
! scope="row" class="fn org" | Bowl barrow 250 m north west of Victoria Farm
| || style="vertical-align:center; text-align:center;"  || 

|- class="vcard without_image"
! scope="row" class="fn org" | Bowl barrow 250 m south east of Redhill Farm
| || style="vertical-align:center; text-align:center;"  || 

|- class="vcard without_image"
! scope="row" class="fn org" | Bowl barrow 250 m west of Starve Lark Farm
| || style="vertical-align:center; text-align:center;"  || 

|- class="vcard without_image"
! scope="row" class="fn org" | Bowl barrow 260 m east of Templedown Farm
| || style="vertical-align:center; text-align:center;"  || 

|- class="vcard without_image"
! scope="row" class="fn org" | Bowl barrow 280 m south east of Ubley Hill Farmhouse
| || style="vertical-align:center; text-align:center;"  || 

|- class="vcard without_image"
! scope="row" class="fn org" | Bowl barrow 300 m north of Hazel Manor
| || style="vertical-align:center; text-align:center;"  || 

|- class="vcard with_image"
! scope="row" class="fn org" | Bowl barrow 300 m north east of Whitnell Corner
| || || 

|- class="vcard without_image"
! scope="row" class="fn org" | Bowl barrow 300 m south west of Harptree Lodge
| || style="vertical-align:center; text-align:center;"  || 

|- class="vcard without_image"
! scope="row" class="fn org" | Bowl barrow 300 m southwest of Moor View
| || style="vertical-align:center; text-align:center;"  || 

|- class="vcard without_image"
! scope="row" class="fn org" | Bowl barrow 300 m west of Newlands Farm
| || style="vertical-align:center; text-align:center;"  || 

|- class="vcard without_image"
! scope="row" class="fn org" | Bowl barrow 310 m southeast of Eastwater Farm
| || style="vertical-align:center; text-align:center;"  || 

|- class="vcard without_image"
! scope="row" class="fn org" | Bowl barrow 320 m east of Lodmore Farm
| || style="vertical-align:center; text-align:center;"  || 

|- class="vcard without_image"
! scope="row" class="fn org" | Bowl barrow 330 m north of Stoke Woods
| || style="vertical-align:center; text-align:center;"  || 

|- class="vcard without_image"
! scope="row" class="fn org" | Bowl barrow 340 m east of Templedown Farm
| || style="vertical-align:center; text-align:center;"  || 

|- class="vcard without_image"
! scope="row" class="fn org" | Bowl barrow 340 m north-east of Wellington Farm
| || style="vertical-align:center; text-align:center;"  || 

|- class="vcard without_image"
! scope="row" class="fn org" | Bowl barrow 350 m northeast of Cheddar Head Farm
| || style="vertical-align:center; text-align:center;"  || 

|- class="vcard without_image"
! scope="row" class="fn org" | Bowl barrow 350 m northwest of Fernhill Farm
| || style="vertical-align:center; text-align:center;"  || 

|- class="vcard without_image"
! scope="row" class="fn org" | Bowl barrow 350 m north west of Harptree Lodge
| || style="vertical-align:center; text-align:center;"  || 

|- class="vcard without_image"
! scope="row" class="fn org" | Bowl barrow 365 m south west of Ubley Warren Farm
| || style="vertical-align:center; text-align:center;"  || 

|- class="vcard without_image"
! scope="row" class="fn org" | Bowl barrow 370 m east of Ubley Hill Farmhouse
| || style="vertical-align:center; text-align:center;"  || 

|- class="vcard without_image"
! scope="row" class="fn org" | Bowl barrow 380 m south east of Southfield Farm
| || style="vertical-align:center; text-align:center;"  || 

|- class="vcard without_image"
! scope="row" class="fn org" | Bowl barrow 380 m south east of Beechbarrow
| || style="vertical-align:center; text-align:center;"  || 

|- class="vcard without_image"
! scope="row" class="fn org" | Bowl barrow 390 m northeast of Bristol Plain Farm
| || style="vertical-align:center; text-align:center;"  || 

|- class="vcard without_image"
! scope="row" class="fn org" | Bowl barrow 390 m northwest of Fernhill Farm
| || style="vertical-align:center; text-align:center;"  || 

|- class="vcard without_image"
! scope="row" class="fn org" | Bowl barrow 400 m north of Stoke Woods
| || style="vertical-align:center; text-align:center;"  || 

|- class="vcard without_image"
! scope="row" class="fn org" | Bowl barrow 400 m north-west of Starve Lark Farm
| || style="vertical-align:center; text-align:center;"  || 

|- class="vcard without_image"
! scope="row" class="fn org" | Bowl barrow 400 m south of Rookham
| || style="vertical-align:center; text-align:center;"  || 

|- class="vcard without_image"
! scope="row" class="fn org" | Bowl barrow 400 m southwest of Moor View
| || style="vertical-align:center; text-align:center;"  || 

|- class="vcard without_image"
! scope="row" class="fn org" | Bowl barrow 410 m northeast of Bristol Plain Farm
| || style="vertical-align:center; text-align:center;"  || 

|- class="vcard without_image"
! scope="row" class="fn org" | Bowl barrow 420 m east of Bristol Plain Farm
| || style="vertical-align:center; text-align:center;"  || 

|- class="vcard without_image"
! scope="row" class="fn org" | Bowl barrow 420 m north of Stoke Woods
| || style="vertical-align:center; text-align:center;"  || 

|- class="vcard without_image"
! scope="row" class="fn org" | Bowl barrow 430 m north of Whitnell Corner
| || style="vertical-align:center; text-align:center;"  || 

|- class="vcard without_image"
! scope="row" class="fn org" | Bowl barrow 430 m north east of Stoke Woods
| || style="vertical-align:center; text-align:center;"  || 

|- class="vcard without_image"
! scope="row" class="fn org" | Bowl barrow 430 m northwest of King Down Farm
| || style="vertical-align:center; text-align:center;"  || 

|- class="vcard without_image"
! scope="row" class="fn org" | Bowl barrow 430 m southwest of King Down Farm
| || style="vertical-align:center; text-align:center;"  || 

|- class="vcard without_image"
! scope="row" class="fn org" | Bowl barrow 435 m north west of Ivy Cottage
| || style="vertical-align:center; text-align:center;"  || 

|- class="vcard with_image"
! scope="row" class="fn org" | Bowl barrow 450 m east of Bristol Plain Farm
| || || 

|- class="vcard without_image"
! scope="row" class="fn org" | Bowl barrow 450 m north west of Harptree Lodge
| || style="vertical-align:center; text-align:center;"  || 

|- class="vcard without_image"
! scope="row" class="fn org" | Bowl barrow 450 m south-east of Red Quar Farm
| || style="vertical-align:center; text-align:center;"  || 

|- class="vcard without_image"
! scope="row" class="fn org" | Bowl barrow 450 m southwest of Fernhill Farm
| || style="vertical-align:center; text-align:center;"  || 

|- class="vcard with_image"
! scope="row" class="fn org" | Bowl barrow, 455 m west of Brimble Pit Pool
| || || 

|- class="vcard without_image"
! scope="row" class="fn org" | Bowl barrow 460 m east of Charterhouse Warren Farm
| || style="vertical-align:center; text-align:center;"  || 

|- class="vcard without_image"
! scope="row" class="fn org" | Bowl barrow 470 m south east of Southfield Farm
| || style="vertical-align:center; text-align:center;"  || 

|- class="vcard without_image"
! scope="row" class="fn org" | Bowl barrow 490 m north west of Pen Hill Farm
| || style="vertical-align:center; text-align:center;"  || 

|- class="vcard without_image"
! scope="row" class="fn org" | Bowl barrow 500 m north of East Water
| || style="vertical-align:center; text-align:center;"  || 

|- class="vcard with_image"
! scope="row" class="fn org" | Bowl barrow 510 m south east of Lodmore Farm
| || || 

|- class="vcard without_image"
! scope="row" class="fn org" | Bowl barrow 520 m south-east of Red Quar Farm
| || style="vertical-align:center; text-align:center;"  || 

|- class="vcard without_image"
! scope="row" class="fn org" | Bowl barrow, 540 m west of Brimble Pit Pool
| || style="vertical-align:center; text-align:center;"  || 

|- class="vcard with_image"
! scope="row" class="fn org" | Bowl barrow 550 m south of Bristol Plain Farm: part of a linear round barrow cemetery
| || || 

|- class="vcard without_image"
! scope="row" class="fn org" | Bowl barrow 550 m southwest of Nordrach
| || style="vertical-align:center; text-align:center;"  || 

|- class="vcard without_image"
! scope="row" class="fn org" | Bowl barrow 550 m south east of Southfield Farm
| || style="vertical-align:center; text-align:center;"  || 

|- class="vcard without_image"
! scope="row" class="fn org" | Bowl barrow 550 m south east of Brimble Pit Pool: one of a group of round barrows north and east of Foxhills Wood
| || style="vertical-align:center; text-align:center;"  || 

|- class="vcard without_image"
! scope="row" class="fn org" | Bowl barrow 570 m south east of Lodmore Farm
| || style="vertical-align:center; text-align:center;"  || 

|- class="vcard without_image"
! scope="row" class="fn org" | Bowl barrow 570 m south east of Southfield Farm
| || style="vertical-align:center; text-align:center;"  || 

|- class="vcard without_image"
! scope="row" class="fn org" | Bowl barrow 570 m west of Newlands Farm
| || style="vertical-align:center; text-align:center;"  || 

|- class="vcard without_image"
! scope="row" class="fn org" | Bowl barrow 590 m south-east of Charterhouse Warren Farm
| || style="vertical-align:center; text-align:center;"  || 

|- class="vcard without_image"
! scope="row" class="fn org" | Bowl barrow 600 m east of Priddy Hill Farm
| || style="vertical-align:center; text-align:center;"  || 

|- class="vcard without_image"
! scope="row" class="fn org" | Bowl barrow 600 m north of Rookham Plantation
| || style="vertical-align:center; text-align:center;"  || 

|- class="vcard with_image"
! scope="row" class="fn org" | Bowl barrow 610 m northwest of Whitestown Farm
| || || 

|- class="vcard without_image"
! scope="row" class="fn org" | Bowl barrow 650 m northeast of Higher Pitts Farm
| || style="vertical-align:center; text-align:center;"  || 

|- class="vcard without_image"
! scope="row" class="fn org" | Bowl barrow 700 m south of Bristol Plain Farm: part of a linear round barrow cemetery
| || style="vertical-align:center; text-align:center;"  || 

|- class="vcard without_image"
! scope="row" class="fn org" | Bowl barrow 730 m southeast of Bristol Plain Farm
| || style="vertical-align:center; text-align:center;"  || 

|- class="vcard without_image"
! scope="row" class="fn org" | Bowl barrow 750 m southwest of Dale Farm
| || style="vertical-align:center; text-align:center;"  || 

|- class="vcard without_image"
! scope="row" class="fn org" | Bowl barrow 760 m southeast of Bristol Plain Farm
| || style="vertical-align:center; text-align:center;"  || 

|- class="vcard without_image"
! scope="row" class="fn org" | Bowl barrow 770 m south of Townsend Farm
| || style="vertical-align:center; text-align:center;"  || 

|- class="vcard without_image"
! scope="row" class="fn org" | Bowl barrow 800 m south of Townsend Farm
| || style="vertical-align:center; text-align:center;"  || 

|- class="vcard without_image"
! scope="row" class="fn org" | Bowl barrow 810 m southeast of Bristol Plain Farm
| || style="vertical-align:center; text-align:center;"  || 

|- class="vcard without_image"
! scope="row" class="fn org" | Bowl barrow 820 m south of Bristol Plain Farm: part of a linear round barrow cemetery
| || style="vertical-align:center; text-align:center;"  || 

|- class="vcard without_image"
! scope="row" class="fn org" | Bowl barrow 850 m south of Bristol Plain Farm: part of a linear round barrow cemetery
| || style="vertical-align:center; text-align:center;"  || 

|- class="vcard without_image"
! scope="row" class="fn org" | Bowl barrow 850 m south of Townsend Farm
| || style="vertical-align:center; text-align:center;"  || 

|- class="vcard without_image"
! scope="row" class="fn org" | Bowl barrow 850 m southeast of Bristol Plain Farm
| || style="vertical-align:center; text-align:center;"  || 

|- class="vcard without_image"
! scope="row" class="fn org" | Bowl barrow 870 m southwest of Charterhouse Warren Farm
| || style="vertical-align:center; text-align:center;"  || 

|- class="vcard without_image"
! scope="row" class="fn org" | Bowl barrow 870 m southwest of Dale Farm
| || style="vertical-align:center; text-align:center;"  || 

|- class="vcard without_image"
! scope="row" class="fn org" | Bowl barrow 900 m south west of Bristol Plain Farm: part of a group of round barrows south and south west of Bristol Plain Farm
| || style="vertical-align:center; text-align:center;"  || 

|- class="vcard without_image"
! scope="row" class="fn org" | Bowl barrow in the garden of Beechbarrow
| || style="vertical-align:center; text-align:center;"  || 

|- class="vcard with_image"
! scope="row" class="fn org" | Bowl barrow on Stock Hill: part of the Stock Hill round barrow cemetery
| || || 

|- class="vcard without_image"
! scope="row" class="fn org" | Bracelet Cave
| class="label" | St Cuthbert Out || class="category" | Cave ||   || || A cave from which nine human skeletons have been uncovered, probably from the Bronze Age. Roman artefacts have also been identified.
| || style="vertical-align:center; text-align:center;"  || 

|- class="vcard with_image"
! scope="row" class="fn org" | Browne's Gate
| class="label" | Wells || class="category" | Gateway ||   || || Brown's Gatehouse (also known as the Dean's Eye) is an entrance gateway into a walled precinct, the Liberty of St Andrew, which encloses the twelfth century Cathedral, the Bishop's Palace, Vicar's Close and the residences of the clergy who serve the cathedral. The Brown's Gatehouse was built around 1451, by Bishop Thomas Beckington (also spelt Beckyngton), and provides the entrance to the Bishop's Place from Sadler Street. It is named after the shoemaker Richard Brown, who was the next door tenant in 1553. It is a two-storey building of Doulting ashlar stone, with a Welsh slate roof with coped gables behind parapets.
| || || 

|- class="vcard without_image"
! scope="row" class="fn org" | Brownes' Hole
| class="label" | Stoke St Michael || class="category" | Cave ||   || || An extensive cave system believed to contain archaeological artefacts.
| || style="vertical-align:center; text-align:center;"  || 

|- class="vcard with_image"
! scope="row" class="fn org" | Burial chamber (remains of), Murtry Hill, Orchardleigh Park
| class="label" | Buckland Dinham || class="category" | Chamber tomb ||   || || A probable burial chamber which was excavated in 1803 and 1804 when human bones and cremation urns were discovered.
| || || 

|- class="vcard without_image"
! scope="row" class="fn org" | Camp 600 yd (548 m) E of Charterhouse
| class="label" | Priddy || class="category" | Hillfort ||   || || Charterhouse Camp is a univallate Iron Age hill fort. There is some evidence, in the form of burials in local caves, of human occupation since the late Neolithic times and the early Bronze Age. The site is associated with Charterhouse Roman Town and may have been the site of Iscalis.
| || style="vertical-align:center; text-align:center;"  || 

|- class="vcard without_image"
! scope="row" class="fn org" | Central of three duck decoys on Walton Moor, south of Lord Bath's Drove
| class="label" | Walton || class="category" | Duck decoy ||   || || An island within a square pool which was supplied by four "pipes". Used as a duck decoy
| || style="vertical-align:center; text-align:center;"  || 

|- class="vcard with_image"
! scope="row" class="fn org" | Charterhouse lead works
| class="label" | Priddy || class="category" | Lead mine ||   || || The lead and silver mines at Charterhouse, were first operated on a large scale by the Romans, from at least A.D. 49. At first the lead/silver industries were tightly controlled by the Roman military, but within a short time the extraction of these metals was contracted out to civilian companies, probably because the silver content of the local ore was not particularly high.
| || || 

|- class="vcard without_image"
! scope="row" class="fn org" | Circular earthwork and barrows on Beacon Hill
| class="label" | Doulting || class="category" | Earthworks ||   || || Three bowl barrows.
| || style="vertical-align:center; text-align:center;"  || 

|- class="vcard without_image"
! scope="row" class="fn org" | Deserted medieval hamlet E of Draycott
| class="label" | Rodney Stoke || class="category" | Earthworks ||   || || A small medieval farmstead including the foundations of a building, and the surrounding field system.
| || style="vertical-align:center; text-align:center;"  || 

|- class="vcard without_image"
! scope="row" class="fn org" | Deserted medieval farmstead and field system NW of Ebbor Wood
| class="label" | Priddy || class="category" | Earthworks ||   || || The site of medieval farmsteads. The more recent was built around 1788 and was ruined by 1886.
| || style="vertical-align:center; text-align:center;"  || 

|- class="vcard without_image"
! scope="row" class="fn org" | Deserted medieval site SW of Tytherington Bridge
| class="label" | Selwood || class="category" | Earthworks ||   || || A deserted medieval village.
| || style="vertical-align:center; text-align:center;"  || 

|- class="vcard without_image"
! scope="row" class="fn org" | Deserted medieval site W of Lower Batch Farm
| class="label" | Lamyatt || class="category" | Earthworks ||   || || Earthworks from a deserted medieval village.
| || style="vertical-align:center; text-align:center;"  || 

|- class="vcard without_image"
! scope="row" class="fn org" | Disc barrow 610 m northeast of Drove Cottage
| || style="vertical-align:center; text-align:center;"  || 

|- class="vcard without_image"
! scope="row" class="fn org" | Dovecote 220 m north of St Philip and St James's Church
| class="label" | Norton St Philip || class="category" | Dovecote ||   || || A 15th century Doulting stone dovecote containing approximately 660 nesting boxes.
| || style="vertical-align:center; text-align:center;"  || 

|- class="vcard without_image"
! scope="row" class="fn org" | Drying house at The Coach House, Willow Vale
| || style="vertical-align:center; text-align:center;"  || 

|- class="vcard without_image"
! scope="row" class="fn org" | Duck decoy 1 km south east of Manor Farm
| || style="vertical-align:center; text-align:center;"  || 

|- class="vcard without_image"
! scope="row" class="fn org" | Duck decoy, 590 m south west of Rice Farm
| class="label" | Sharpham || class="category" | Duck decoy ||   || || The site of a four pipe duck decoy with two small islands in a square pool. The site was dredged in 1984 and 1985 and still attracts water fowl.
| || style="vertical-align:center; text-align:center;"  || 

|- class="vcard without_image"
! scope="row" class="fn org" | Duck decoy, 820 m SSW of Little Huckham Farm: the western of three decoys on Walton Moor
| class="label" | Walton || class="category" | Duck decoy ||   || || A duck decoy which survives as an oval pool.
| || style="vertical-align:center; text-align:center;"  || 

|- class="vcard without_image"
! scope="row" class="fn org" | Duck decoy, 950 m south west of junction of Westhay Moor Drove and Lewis's Drove
| class="label" | Meare || class="category" | Duck decoy ||   || || A six pipe duck decoy from which a rectangular pool area can be seen.
| || style="vertical-align:center; text-align:center;"  || 

|- class="vcard without_image"
! scope="row" class="fn org" | Duck decoy east of Barrow Wood Lane
| class="label" | Westbury || class="category" | Duck decoy ||   || || A duck decoy with a complex arrangement of ditches and channels, probably used from the late 18th or early 19th century but out of use by 1840.
| || style="vertical-align:center; text-align:center;"  || 

|- class="vcard without_image"
! scope="row" class="fn org" | Duck decoy in Sharpham Park, 600 m south west of Avalon Farm
The site was dredged in 1985 and still attracts water fowl.
| || style="vertical-align:center; text-align:center;"  || 

|- class="vcard without_image"
! scope="row" class="fn org" | Early Christian settlement and monastic site at Marchey Farm
| class="label" | Wookey || class="category" | Earthworks ||  to Middle Ages  || || Earthworks from a Christian settlement which was also occupied during the Roman period and Middle Ages. The remains of a rectangular building which is thought to have been a chapel have been identified surrounded by a bank and ditch. The site which was known as Martinsey or Martin's Island and was connected with Glastonbury Abbey.
| || style="vertical-align:center; text-align:center;"  || 

|- class="vcard without_image"
! scope="row" class="fn org" | Earthwork N of Stubbs Wood, Merehead
| class="label" | Wanstrow || class="category" | Earthworks ||   || || An earthwork bank and ditch which may related to a promontory hill fort.
| || style="vertical-align:center; text-align:center;"  || 

|- class="vcard without_image"
! scope="row" class="fn org" | Earthworks S of Tadhill Farm
| class="label" | Downhead || class="category" | Earthworks ||   || || A possible camp, cattle enclosure or homestead which may have been occupied during the Iron Age.
| || style="vertical-align:center; text-align:center;"  || 

|- class="vcard with_image"
! scope="row" class="fn org" | Farleigh Hungerford Castle
| class="label" | Farleigh Hungerford || class="category" | Castle ||   || || Farleigh Hungerford Castle was built in two phases: the inner court was constructed between 1377 and 1383 by Sir Thomas Hungerford. His son, Sir Walter Hungerford, extended the castle with an additional, outer court, enclosing the parish church in the process. In the English Civil War in 1642, the castle was seized by Royalist forces in 1643, but recaptured by Parliament without a fight near the end of the conflict in 1645. By the 18th century the castle fell into disrepair; in 1730 it was bought by the Houlton family, when much of it was broken up for salvage. In the 1915 Farleigh Hungerford Castle was sold to the Office of Works and a restoration programme began. It is now owned by English Heritage, who operate it as a tourist attraction.
| || || 

|- class="vcard with_image"
! scope="row" class="fn org" | Fenny Castle: a motte and bailey castle
Little remains of the stonework, and there is evidence of extensive quarrying. The mound is now covered in grass and scrub with a few trees.
| || || 

|- class="vcard with_image"
! scope="row" class="fn org" | Fenny Castle Cross: a medieval wayside cross 20 m north west of Castle Farm, Castle
| class="label" | Wookey || class="category" | Cross ||   || || The remains of a wayside cross with three square steps.
| || || 

|- class="vcard without_image"
! scope="row" class="fn org" | Five bowl barrows 500 m north west of Cuckoo Cleeves: part of the Stock Hill round barrow cemetery
| || style="vertical-align:center; text-align:center;"  ||

|- class="vcard without_image"
! scope="row" class="fn org" | Four round barrows SE of Miners' Arms Inn, Chewton Rabbit Warren
| class="label" | Chewton Mendip || class="category" | Round barrow ||   || || A group of round barrows.
| || style="vertical-align:center; text-align:center;"  || 

|- class="vcard with_image"
! scope="row" class="fn org" | Fussell's Lower Works: an iron edge tool works, 210 m south east of Wadbury
| class="label" | Mells || class="category" | Iron works ||   || || The Old Iron Works is a 0.25 hectare biological Site of Special Scientific Interest. The site is a ruined iron works, which mainly produced agricultural edge-tools which were exported all over the world, and is now, in addition to its unique and major importance in relation to industrial archaeology, used as a breeding site by horseshoe bats. It is included in the Heritage at Risk Register produced by Historic England.
| || || 

|- class="vcard with_image"
! scope="row" class="fn org" | Glastonbury Abbey
| class="label" | Glastonbury || class="category" | Abbey ||   || || Glastonbury Abbey was a monastery founded in the 7th century and enlarged in the 10th, before a major fire in 1184 destroyed the buildings. It was rebuilt and by the 14th century was one of the richest and most powerful monasteries in England. The abbey was suppressed during the Dissolution of the Monasteries under King Henry VIII of England. The last abbot, Richard Whiting (Whyting), was hanged, drawn and quartered as a traitor on Glastonbury Tor in 1539. From at least the 12th century the Glastonbury area was frequently associated with the legend of King Arthur, a connection promoted by medieval monks who asserted that Glastonbury was Avalon. Christian legends have also claimed that the abbey was founded by Joseph of Arimathea in the 1st century. The ruins of Glastonbury Abbey were purchased by the Bath and Wells Diocesan Trust in 1908 and are now the property of and managed by the Glastonbury Abbey trust.
| || || 

|- class="vcard with_image"
! scope="row" class="fn org" | Glastonbury Lake Village
| class="label" | near Godney || class="category" | Crannog ||   || || Glastonbury Lake Village was an Iron Age village on a 'crannog' or man made island in the Somerset Levels. It has been described as "the best preserved prehistoric village ever found in the United Kingdom". It was first constructed 250 B.C. by laying down timber and clay. Wooden houses and barns were then built on the clay base and occupied by up to 200 people at any time until the village was abandoned around 50 B.C.
| || || 

|- class="vcard without_image"
! scope="row" class="fn org" | Group of round barrows 750 m north west of Ivy Cottage
| || style="vertical-align:center; text-align:center;"  || 

|- class="vcard with_image"
! scope="row" class="fn org" | Group of seven round barrows 380 m east of East Water Drove (Part of Priddy Nine Barrows Cemetery)
| class="label" | Priddy || class="category" | Round barrows ||   || || Priddy Nine Barrows and Ashen Hill Barrow Cemeteries are a collection of round barrows, dating from the Bronze Age. The barrows sit on crests of land at either end of a field in an area of the Mendip Hills with several Neolithic remains. They are assumed to be related to the Priddy Circles which lie  to the north. Ashen Hill consists of six bowl barrows and two bell barrows aligned east to west while Priddy Nine Barrows divided into one group of seven round barrows and another pair slightly separated from the others. Excavations in 1815 uncovered cremation burials and grave goods. A geophysical magnetometry survey suggested that there may have been three further barrows.
| || || 

|- class="vcard without_image"
! scope="row" class="fn org" | Group of three bowl barrows and one long barrow 90 m northeast of Barrow House Farm
| || style="vertical-align:center; text-align:center;"  || 

|- class="vcard with_image"
! scope="row" class="fn org" | Hales Castle: a ringwork and associated earthworks on Coles Hill
| class="label" | Frome || class="category" | Motte-and-bailey castle ||   || || Hales Castle was a medieval castle was built, probably in the years immediately after the Norman conquest of England in 1066. It comprises banks and outer ditches and has an unfinished bailey.
| || || 

|- class="vcard without_image"
! scope="row" class="fn org" | Henge 370 m north east of Drove Cottage
| class="label" | Priddy || class="category" | Henge ||   || || Drove Cottage Henge is situated in a valley. In the northern portion of this central area is a low-lying mound in front of the exit, which appears as a break in the outside bank.
| || style="vertical-align:center; text-align:center;"  || 

|- class="vcard without_image"
! scope="row" class="fn org" | Hillfort at Fox Covert, 550 m north east of Lamyatt Lodge
| class="label" | Lamyatt || class="category" | Earthworks ||   || || An early Iron Age earthwork, probably a stock enclosure but known as Fox Covert, occupies  on a spur of Creech Hill overlooking the River Alham valley.
| || style="vertical-align:center; text-align:center;"  || 

|- class="vcard with_image"
! scope="row" class="fn org" | Hillfort on Roddenbury Hill
| class="label" | Selwood || class="category" | Hill fort ||   || || Roddenbury Hillfort is a univallate Iron Age hillfort.
| || || 

|- class="vcard without_image"
! scope="row" class="fn org" | Kingsdown camp, Mells Down
| class="label" | Buckland Dinham || class="category" | Univallate hill fort ||   || || Kingsdown Camp is an Iron Age hill fort. There is an entrance on the northeast side. The fort continued to be used by the Romans.
| || style="vertical-align:center; text-align:center;"  || 

|- class="vcard without_image"
! scope="row" class="fn org" | King's Castle enclosures, Iron Age defended settlement
| class="label" | St Cuthbert Out || class="category" | Hill fort ||   || || King's Castle is an Iron Age enclosed hilltop settlement at the south-western edge of the Mendip Hills. It consists of two or three interlinked sub-enclosures, with what appears to be a field system extending to the east; an unusual layout, the site remains relatively little studied and has not been archaeologically excavated. It is a scheduled monument, and shares its name with the surrounding King's Castle Wood—today a Somerset Wildlife Trust nature reserve—though this name is probably a modern invention.
| || style="vertical-align:center; text-align:center;"  || 

|- class="vcard without_image"
! scope="row" class="fn org" | Lake villages NW of Oxenpill
| class="label" | Meare || class="category" | Crannog ||   || || Meare Lake Village is the site of an Iron Age settlement on the Somerset Levels. In prehistoric times there were two villages situated within the now-drained Meare Pool, occupied at different times between 300 B.C. and 100 AD. The villages were built on a morass on an artificial foundation of timber filled with brushwood, bracken, rubble and clay.
| || style="vertical-align:center; text-align:center;"  || 

|- class="vcard without_image"
! scope="row" class="fn org" | Lime Kiln Hill Quarry Cave
| class="label" | Mells || class="category" | Cave ||   || || A cave from which Pleistocene faunal remains and a Middle Palaeolithic chert hand axe have been recovered.
| || style="vertical-align:center; text-align:center;"  || 

|- class="vcard without_image"
! scope="row" class="fn org" | Linear barrow cemetery comprising six bowl barrows 510 m south west of Townsend Farm
| class="label" | Priddy || class="category" | Bowl barrow ||   || || Six bowl barrows in a line.
| || style="vertical-align:center; text-align:center;"  || 

|- class="vcard with_image"
! scope="row" class="fn org" | Linear earthwork in Butleigh Wood
| class="label" | Butleigh || class="category" | Earthworks ||   || || The New Ditch is a linear earthwork of possible Iron Age or Medieval construction. Its construction is similar to Ponter's Ball Dyke  to the northeast, with the dyke on the south east of the embankment, but of less massive construction. Both were probably part of a more extensive defence scheme. It is debatable whether this site is ancient because it is located close to a medieval woodland and a deer park.
| || || 

|- class="vcard without_image"
! scope="row" class="fn org" | Long barrow 180 m north of Lime House
| || style="vertical-align:center; text-align:center;"  || 

|- class="vcard without_image"
! scope="row" class="fn org" | Long barrow 230 m east of Chewton Plot
| || style="vertical-align:center; text-align:center;"  || 

|- class="vcard without_image"
! scope="row" class="fn org" | Long barrow 370 m south-south-east of Castle Farm
| || style="vertical-align:center; text-align:center;"  || 

|- class="vcard without_image"
! scope="row" class="fn org" | Long barrow and bowl barrow 430 m north west of the Mendip Nature Research Station
| || style="vertical-align:center; text-align:center;"  || 

|- class="vcard without_image"
! scope="row" class="fn org" | Long barrow 600 m east north east of Brimble Pit Pool
| || style="vertical-align:center; text-align:center;"  || 

|- class="vcard without_image"
! scope="row" class="fn org" | Long barrow, round barrow and cairn on Pen Hill
| || style="vertical-align:center; text-align:center;"  || 

|- class="vcard with_image"
! scope="row" class="fn org" | Maesbury Castle small multivallate hillfort
| class="label" | Croscombe || class="category" | Hill fort ||   || || Maesbury Castle is an Iron Age hill fort. Entrances are to the south-east and north-east (with possible outworks).
| || || 

|- class="vcard with_image"
! scope="row" class="fn org" | Market cross in the market place
| class="label" | Shepton Mallet || class="category" | Market cross ||   || || The hexagonal market cross was built in the early 16th century. The central column is surrounded by six segmental arches which were added around 1700. Six rebels from the Monmouth Rebellion were executed at the site in 1685.
| || || 

|- class="vcard without_image"
! scope="row" class="fn org" | Marston Moat
| class="label" | Trudoxhill || class="category" | Earthwork ||   || || Marston Moat is the site of a fortified manor house built before 1195.
| || style="vertical-align:center; text-align:center;"  || 

|- class="vcard without_image"
! scope="row" class="fn org" | Medieval and post-medieval coal mining remains in Harridge Wood and Edford Wood South
| class="label" | Ashwick || class="category" | Earthworks ||   || || Earthworks including mounds, spoil tips and bell pits from coal mining which continued at the site until the 17th or 18th century.
| || style="vertical-align:center; text-align:center;"  || 

|- class="vcard without_image"
! scope="row" class="fn org" | Medieval coal mining remains immediately south of Benter Cross
| class="label" | Ashwick || class="category" | Earthworks ||   || || Earthworks including spoil mounds and shafts from coal mining in the medieval period which may have start as early as the Roman occupation of Britain.
| || style="vertical-align:center; text-align:center;"  || 

|- class="vcard without_image"
! scope="row" class="fn org" | Medieval wayside cross at Bodden
| class="label" | Doulting || class="category" | Cross ||   || || A square base with the  remains of the shaft of a cross.
| || style="vertical-align:center; text-align:center;"  || 

|- class="vcard without_image"
! scope="row" class="fn org" | Medieval farmstead, E of Butleigh Wood
| class="label" | Butleigh || class="category" | Earthworks ||   || || Earthworks from a deserted medieval settlement.
| || style="vertical-align:center; text-align:center;"  || 

|- class="vcard with_image"
! scope="row" class="fn org" | Medieval standing cross 50 m west of St Peter's Church
In the 19th century the cruciform head was restored.
| || || 

|- class="vcard with_image"
! scope="row" class="fn org" | Medieval standing cross 80 m south of St Mary's Church
| class="label" | Croscombe || class="category" | Cross ||   || || An octagonal base of three steps supports the shaft of the cross. The lower  of the shaft is original. The upper part is more recent.
| || || 

|- class="vcard without_image"
! scope="row" class="fn org" | Moated manor house site, Spargrove Farm
| class="label" | Batcombe || class="category" | Earthwork ||   || || Earthwork remains of a deserted medieval village surrounded by a moat. It was deserted in the 16th century.
| || style="vertical-align:center; text-align:center;"  || 

|- class="vcard without_image"
! scope="row" class="fn org" | Murtry Old Bridge
| class="label" | Buckland Dinham || class="category" | Bridge ||   || || A stone arch bridge. Two of the arches are original the other has been replaced.
| || style="vertical-align:center; text-align:center;"  || 

|- class="vcard with_image"
! scope="row" class="fn org" | Nunney Castle
| class="label" | Nunney || class="category" | Castle ||   || || Nunney Castle was built in the late 14th century by Sir John Delamare on the profits of his involvement in the Hundred Years' War, the moated castle's architectural style, possibly influenced by the design of French castles, has provoked considerable academic debate. Remodelled during the late 16th century, Nunney Castle was damaged during the English Civil War and is now ruined. The architectural historian Nikolaus Pevsner has described Nunney as "aesthetically the most impressive castle in Somerset."
| || || 

|- class="vcard without_image"
! scope="row" class="fn org" | Outlook Cave
| class="label" | Ebbor Gorge || class="category" | Cave ||   || || Human and animal bones from the Neolithic were recovered from the cave in 1907.
| || style="vertical-align:center; text-align:center;"  || 

|- class="vcard with_image"
! scope="row" class="fn org" | Pair of bowl barrows 350 m NNE of Whitnell Corner
| || || 

|- class="vcard with_image"
! scope="row" class="fn org" | Pair of bowl barrows 405 m east of East Water Drove (Part of Priddy Nine Barrows Cemetery)
| class="label" | Chewton Mendip || class="category" | Bowl barrow ||   || || Priddy Nine Barrows and Ashen Hill Barrow Cemeteries include two bowl barrows which are separated from the others.
| || || 

|- class="vcard without_image"
! scope="row" class="fn org" | Pair of bowl barrows 640 m south of Bristol Plain Farm: part of a linear round barrow cemetery
| || style="vertical-align:center; text-align:center;"  || 

|- class="vcard with_image"
! scope="row" class="fn org" | Part of the Hospital of St Mary Magdalene, Magdalene Street
| class="label" | Glastonbury || class="category" | Almshouses ||   || || In the 1070s St Margaret's Chapel was built on Magdelene Street, originally as a hospital and later as almshouses for the poor. The building dates from 1444. The roof of the hall is thought to have been removed after the Dissolution, and some of the building was demolished in the 1960s. It is Grade II* listed, and a scheduled monument. In 2010 plans were announced to restore the building.
| || || 

|- class="vcard with_image"
! scope="row" class="fn org" | Ponter's Ball linear earthwork
| class="label" | Glastonbury || class="category" | Dyke ||   || || Ponter's Ball Dyke is a linear earthwork. It consists of an embankment with a ditch on the east side. Interpretation of the site is not clear. It is possible that it was part of a longer defensive barrier associated with New Ditch three miles to the south-west which is built in a similar manner. It has been suggested that it is part of a great Celtic sanctuary, probably 3rd century B.C., while others date it to the post-Roman period and connect it with the Dark Age occupation on Glastonbury Tor. The 1970 excavation suggests the 12th century or later.
| || || 

|- class="vcard without_image"
! scope="row" class="fn org" | Priddy Circle and barrow cemetery 400 m north of Castle of Comfort Inn
| class="label" | Priddy || class="category" | Earthwork enclosures ||   || || Priddy Circles are a linear arrangement of four circular earthwork enclosures. They are described as 'probable Neolithic ritual or ceremonial monuments similar to a henge'.
| || style="vertical-align:center; text-align:center;"  || 

|- class="vcard without_image"
! scope="row" class="fn org" | Priddy Glebe Barrow: a bowl barrow 25 m north of St. Lawrence's Church
| || style="vertical-align:center; text-align:center;"  || 

|- class="vcard without_image"
! scope="row" class="fn org" | Rhinoceros Hole, Wookey
| class="label" | St Cuthbert Out || class="category" | Cave ||   || || A collapsed rock shelter which was used by humans between 100,000 and 40,000 years ago.
| || style="vertical-align:center; text-align:center;"  || 

|- class="vcard with_image"
! scope="row" class="fn org" | Rode Bridge
| class="label" | Rode || class="category" | Bridge ||   || || A stone two-arch bridge over the River Frome.
| || || 

|- class="vcard without_image"
! scope="row" class="fn org" | Roman amphitheatre 1/2 mile (800 m) N of Charterhouse
| class="label" | Charterhouse || class="category" | Amphitheatre ||   || || The amphitheatre stood west of Charterhouse Roman Town. It is the only one in England to exist at a lead mine. It was probably a place of entertainment for the soldiers at the Roman fort which was established here.
| || style="vertical-align:center; text-align:center;"  || 

|- class="vcard without_image"
! scope="row" class="fn org" | Roman building 270 m north east of Priddy church
| class="label" | Priddy || class="category" | Earthwork ||   || || The site of as Roman building. Artefacts from the 1st to 3rd centuries have been uncovered.
| || style="vertical-align:center; text-align:center;"  || 

|- class="vcard without_image"
! scope="row" class="fn org" | Roman building 600 yd (549 m) SW of Lower Sutton Farm
| class="label" | Ditcheat || class="category" | Earthwork ||   || || Earthworks from a Roman settlement. Pottery from the 3rd and 4th centuries has been uncovered.
| || style="vertical-align:center; text-align:center;"  || 

|- class="vcard without_image"
! scope="row" class="fn org" | Roman building at Lamyatt Beacon, Creech Hill
| class="label" | Lamyatt || class="category" | Earthwork ||   || || Lamyatt Beacon marks the highest area of Creech Hill. It is the site of a Romano-Celtic temple, which was in use from 250 A.D. to 375 A.D.
| || style="vertical-align:center; text-align:center;"  || 

|- class="vcard without_image"
! scope="row" class="fn org" | Roman settlement at Town Field
| class="label" | Priddy || class="category" | Earthwork ||   || || Charterhouse Roman Town grew up around the north-western edge of prehistoric lead and silver mines, which were exploited by the Romans. Extraction is thought to have begun as early as 49 A.D. and continued until at least the 4th century.
| || style="vertical-align:center; text-align:center;"  || 

|- class="vcard without_image"
! scope="row" class="fn org" | Romano-British settlement on Stoke Moor
| class="label" | Rodney Stoke || class="category" | Earthwork ||   || || Earthworks from a  Roman settlement. Coins and pottery from the 1st to 3rd centuries have been uncovered.
| || style="vertical-align:center; text-align:center;"  || 

|- class="vcard without_image"
! scope="row" class="fn org" | Roman villa complex, 330 m south-west of St Algar's Farm
| class="label" | Selwood || class="category" | Roman villa ||   || || Earthworks from a Roman villa surrounded by an enclosure with a ditch surrounding  from which a large number of artefacts have been recovered.
| || style="vertical-align:center; text-align:center;"  || 

|- class="vcard without_image"
! scope="row" class="fn org" | Roman villa NW of Port Way
| class="label" | Hemington || class="category" | Roman villa ||   || || Earthworks from a Roman villa.
| || style="vertical-align:center; text-align:center;"  || 

|- class="vcard without_image"
! scope="row" class="fn org" | Roman villa NW of Two Acre Plantation
| class="label" | Street || class="category" | Roman villa ||   || || Earthworks from a Roman villa.
| || style="vertical-align:center; text-align:center;"  || 

|- class="vcard without_image"
! scope="row" class="fn org" | Round barrow cemetery 470 m and 400 m north of Pen Hill Farm
| class="label" | St Cuthbert Out || class="category" | Round barrow ||   || || A round barrow cemetery consisting of five bowl barrows and two cairns.
| || style="vertical-align:center; text-align:center;"  || 

|- class="vcard without_image"
! scope="row" class="fn org" | Round barrow 1435 m SE of Miners' Arms Inn
| class="label" | Chewton Mendip || class="category" | Round barrow ||   || || A mound which may be a barrow or a spoil heap.
| || style="vertical-align:center; text-align:center;"  || 

|- class="vcard without_image"
! scope="row" class="fn org" | Round barrow in Beacon Plantation
| class="label" | Doulting || class="category" | Round barrow ||   || || A group of six round barrows.
| || style="vertical-align:center; text-align:center;"  || 

|- class="vcard with_image"
! scope="row" class="fn org" | Round barrow on Beacon Hill
| class="label" | Ashwick || class="category" | Round barrow ||   || || Three round barrows.
| || || 

|- class="vcard with_image"
! scope="row" class="fn org" | Round barrows in and near Wright's Piece
| class="label" | Priddy || class="category" | Round barrow ||   || || A collection of round barrows.
| || || 

|- class="vcard without_image"
! scope="row" class="fn org" | Round barrows SW of Cleeve's Plantation
| class="label" | Chewton Mendip || class="category" | Round barrow ||   || || A probable bowl barrow.
| || style="vertical-align:center; text-align:center;"  || 

|- class="vcard without_image"
! scope="row" class="fn org" | Rowberrow: a bowl barrow 40 m north of Hill View
| || style="vertical-align:center; text-align:center;"  || 

|- class="vcard without_image"
! scope="row" class="fn org" | Savory's Hole
| class="label" | St Cuthbert Out || class="category" | Cave ||   || || A cave in Ebbor Gorge from which human bones have been recovered.
| || style="vertical-align:center; text-align:center;"  || 

|- class="vcard without_image"
! scope="row" class="fn org" | Section of medieval road, south of Pomparles Bridge, north of Street
| class="label" | Street || class="category" | Road ||   || || The site of a medieval road.
| || style="vertical-align:center; text-align:center;"  || 

|- class="vcard without_image"
! scope="row" class="fn org" | Section of the Abbot's Way trackway, 500 m WSW of Honeygar Farm
| class="label" | Meare || class="category" | Timber trackway ||   || || The site of the preserved remains of the Abbot's Way a corduroy timber trackway which was built between 2630 and 2280 B.C.
| || style="vertical-align:center; text-align:center;"  || 

|- class="vcard without_image"
! scope="row" class="fn org" | Sections of the Sweet Track and Post Track, 240 m south west of Sunnyside Farm
| class="label" | Meare || class="category" | Timber trackway ||   || || A section of the Sweet Track, an ancient causeway built in either 3807 or 3806 B.C. and the earlier structure, the Post Track. Construction was of crossed wooden poles, driven into the waterlogged soil to support a walkway that consisted mainly of planks of oak, laid end-to-end. The track was only used for a period of around 10 years and was then abandoned, probably due to rising water levels.
| || style="vertical-align:center; text-align:center;"  || 

|- class="vcard without_image"
! scope="row" class="fn org" | Sections of the Sweet Track and Post Track, 250 m ESE of Station House
| class="label" | Meare || class="category" | Timber trackway ||   || || A section of the Sweet Track, an ancient causeway built in either 3807 or 3806 B.C. and the earlier structure, the Post Track. Construction was of crossed wooden poles, driven into the waterlogged soil to support a walkway that consisted mainly of planks of oak, laid end-to-end. The track was only used for a period of around 10 years and was then abandoned, probably due to rising water levels.
| || style="vertical-align:center; text-align:center;"  || 

|- class="vcard with_image"
! scope="row" class="fn org" | Small Down Knoll camp
| class="label" | Evercreech || class="category" | Hill fort ||   || || Small Down Knoll, or Small Down Camp, is a Bronze Age hill fort. Finds of flints indicate a prehistoric Mesolithic occupation. The fort has multiple ramparts (multivallate) following the contours of the hilltop, enclosing an area of about 2.4 ha (6 acres). Most of the perimeter is a double rampart, but the flatter eastern side has an extra counterscarp rampart with well-defined double ditches. There are two entrances to the south-east: one is a simple opening with evidence of a guardhouse; and the other shows linear features of a holloway. The fort contains about 14 round barrows (tumuli), which form a line of burials running east-west along the crest of the hill. The fort and the barrows appear to be Bronze Age, but excavations have found some Iron Age pottery in the barrows and the ditches.
| || || 

|- class="vcard without_image"
! scope="row" class="fn org" | Small multivallate promontory fort on Blacker's Hill
| class="label" | Chilcompton || class="category" | Hill fort ||   || || Blacker's Hill is roughly rectangular and is a promentary type. In some places the ramparts survive to a considerable height but on the north east side the inner rampart and ditch have been destroyed. There are three gaps but only that on the east seems to be original.
| || style="vertical-align:center; text-align:center;"  || 

|- class="vcard without_image"
! scope="row" class="fn org" | St Cuthbert's and Chewton lead mines and Fair Lady Well
| class="label" | Priddy || class="category" | Lead mines ||   || || The remains of lead mines used between the Romano-British era until the late 19th century. It consists of a series of earthen banks and pools; however the buildings no longer exist. Fair Lady Well is a stone chamber over a spring which was constructed in the Middle Ages.
| || style="vertical-align:center; text-align:center;"  || 

|- class="vcard with_image"
! scope="row" class="fn org" | St Michael's Church, monastic remains, and other settlement remains on Glastonbury Tor
| class="label" | Glastonbury Tor || class="category" | Ruined church tower ||   || || Several buildings have been constructed on the summit of Glastonbury Tor during the Saxon and early medieval periods; they have been interpreted as an early church and monks' hermitage. The head of a wheel cross dating from the 10th or 11th century has been recovered. The original wooden church was destroyed by an earthquake in 1275, and the stone Church of St Michael built on the site in the 14th century. Its tower remains, although it has been restored and partially rebuilt several times. Archaeological excavations during the 20th century sought to clarify the background of the monument and church, but some aspects of their history remain unexplained.
| || || 

|- class="vcard without_image"
! scope="row" class="fn org" | Stow Barrow : a bowl barrow 700 m southwest of Haydon Grange Farm
| || style="vertical-align:center; text-align:center;"  || 

|- class="vcard with_image"
! scope="row" class="fn org" | Tedbury Camp
| class="label" | Great Elm || class="category" | Multivallate hill fort ||   || || Promontory hill fort defended by two parallel banks. Also the site of Roman occupation and a coin hoard.
| || || 

|- class="vcard with_image"
! scope="row" class="fn org" | The Abbey Barn at Abbey Farm
| class="label" | Glastonbury || class="category" | Barn ||   || || The Tithe Barn is now the venue for the Somerset Rural Life Museum. It is a museum of the social and agricultural history of Somerset, housed in buildings surrounding a 14th century barn once belonging to Glastonbury Abbey. Threshing and winnowing would also have been carried out in the barn. The barn which was built from local 'shelly' limestone, with thick timbers supporting the stone tiling of the roof. After the Dissolution of the Monasteries in 1539 the barn was given to the Duke of Somerset. By the early 20th century it was being used as a farm store by the Mapstone family. In 1974 they donated it to Somerset County Council and between 1976 and 1978 underwent restoration.
| || || 

|- class="vcard with_image"
! scope="row" class="fn org" | The Abbot's Fish House and fishponds
| class="label" | Meare || class="category" | Fish house ||   || || The Abbot's Fish House was built in the 14th century. It is the only surviving monastic fishery building in England. Fishing was an important source of food for the monks of Glastonbury Abbey. Fishing was carried out in artificial ponds, which were mentioned at Meare in the Domesday Book and from the River Brue and Meare Pool. The present rectangular stone building was constructed by the abbot between 1322 and 1335 for the storage and processing of the fish and as a residence for the chief fisherman. After the Dissolution of the Monasteries the building fell into disrepair and it was seriously damaged by fire in the 1880s. Some restoration has been undertaken during the 20th century, including the replacement of the roof in the 1920s.
| || || 

|- class="vcard with_image"
! scope="row" class="fn org" | The Devil's Bed and Bolster long barrow
| || || 

|- class="vcard without_image"
! scope="row" class="fn org" | The easternmost of three duck decoys on Walton Moor
| class="label" | Walton || class="category" | Duck decoy ||   || || The remains of a duck decoy with a central island.
| || style="vertical-align:center; text-align:center;"  || 

|- class="vcard without_image"
! scope="row" class="fn org" | The Falconry, Farleigh Hungerford
| class="label" | Norton St Philip || class="category" | Falconry ||   || || A rectangular stone two-storey cartshed and falconry.
| || style="vertical-align:center; text-align:center;"  || 

|- class="vcard with_image"
! scope="row" class="fn org" | The tithe barn
| class="label" | Doulting || class="category" | Tithe barn ||   || || The Tithe Barn was built in the 15th century. Tithe barns were used to store tithes, from the local farmers to the ecclesiastical landlords. In this case the landlord was Glastonbury Abbey.
| || || 

|- class="vcard with_image"
! scope="row" class="fn org" | Tithe Barn, Pilton
| class="label" | Pilton || class="category" | Tithe barn ||   || || The Tithe Barn in Pilton was built in the 14th century as a tithe barn to hold produce for Glastonbury Abbey. It was damaged by fire in 1963 and it remained a wreck until Michael Eavis, organiser of the Glastonbury Festival, bought it in 1995, and presented the barn to the Pilton Barn Trust. The project was made possible with a grant of £400,000 from English Heritage. The Glastonbury festival contributed a further £100,000.
| || || 

|- class="vcard with_image"
! scope="row" class="fn org" | The Tribunal
| class="label" | Glastonbury || class="category" | House ||   || || The Tribunal was built in the 15th century as a merchant's house. The history of the building is not well documented, although the majority of the present stone house was constructed in the 15th century on the site of a 12th-century wooden building. The current front wall was added in the 16th century. It has been used as a merchant's house and possibly a shop and school. The building is currently in the guardianship of English Heritage and used as a tourist information centre. On the first floor is the museum of the Glastonbury Antiquarian Society which houses artefacts from Glastonbury Lake Village.
| || || 

|- class="vcard without_image"
! scope="row" class="fn org" | Three bowl barrows at Green Ore, two 150 m south east and one 420 m south west of Newlands Farm
| || style="vertical-align:center; text-align:center;"  || 

|- class="vcard without_image"
! scope="row" class="fn org" | Three bowl barrows 400 m north west of Haydon Hut
| || style="vertical-align:center; text-align:center;"  || 

|- class="vcard without_image"
! scope="row" class="fn org" | Three bowl barrows in Big Plantation, 690 m south west of Beechbarrow
| || style="vertical-align:center; text-align:center;"  || 

|- class="vcard with_image"
! scope="row" class="fn org" | Three of the Priddy Circles and one barrow, 400 m west of Castle Farm
| class="label" | Priddy || class="category" | Earthwork and enclosures ||   || || Priddy Circles are a linear arrangement of four circular earthwork enclosures. They are described as 'probable Neolithic ritual or ceremonial monuments similar to a henge'.
| || || 

|- class="vcard without_image"
! scope="row" class="fn org" | Timber trackway site, 700 m west of Honeygar Farm
| class="label" | Meare || class="category" | Timber trackway ||   || || The remains of a brushwood track built between 3650 and 3500 B.C.
| || style="vertical-align:center; text-align:center;"  || 

|- class="vcard without_image"
! scope="row" class="fn org" | Tinney's trackways, west of Sharpham Bridge
| class="label" | Sharpham || class="category" | Timber trackway ||   || || The route of several brushwood tracks.
| || style="vertical-align:center; text-align:center;"  || 

|- class="vcard without_image"
! scope="row" class="fn org" | Two bell barrows and a bowl barrow 370 m east of Clover Farm: part of a group of round barrows west of Cranmore railway station
| || style="vertical-align:center; text-align:center;"  || 

|- class="vcard without_image"
! scope="row" class="fn org" | Two bowl barrows 350 m south of Brimble Pit Pool: part of a group of round barrows north and east of Foxhills Wood
| || style="vertical-align:center; text-align:center;"  || 

|- class="vcard without_image"
! scope="row" class="fn org" | Two bowl barrows 550 m south west of Haydon House
| || style="vertical-align:center; text-align:center;"  || 

|- class="vcard without_image"
! scope="row" class="fn org" | Two bowl barrows 850 m south east of Brimble Pit Pool: part of a group of round barrows north and east of Foxhills Wood
| || style="vertical-align:center; text-align:center;"  || 

|- class="vcard without_image"
! scope="row" class="fn org" | Two bowl barrows on Barren Down, 250 m north west of Princes Lodge
| || style="vertical-align:center; text-align:center;"  || 

|- class="vcard without_image"
! scope="row" class="fn org" | Two round barrows on Beacon Hill
| || style="vertical-align:center; text-align:center;"  || 

|- class="vcard without_image"
! scope="row" class="fn org" | Two round barrows SE of Castle of Comfort Inn
| class="label" | Chewton Mendip || class="category" | Round barrow ||   || || A long mound believed to be two adjacent round barrows.
| || style="vertical-align:center; text-align:center;"  || 

|- class="vcard without_image"
! scope="row" class="fn org" | Two round barrows 600 yd (550 m) ENE of Green Ore
| class="label" | Chewton Mendip || class="category" | Round barrow ||   || || Two mounds which are believed to be round barrows, surrounded by several other mounds which are thought to be spoil heaps.
| || style="vertical-align:center; text-align:center;"  || 

|- class="vcard without_image"
! scope="row" class="fn org" | Vobster Breach colliery, 890 m ENE of Tweed Farm
| class="label" | Leigh-on-Mendip || class="category" | Coal mine ||   || || The remains of a coal mine including the coking ovens, shafts, drainage adits and branch railway.
| || style="vertical-align:center; text-align:center;"  || 

|- class="vcard without_image"
! scope="row" class="fn org" | Wadbury Camp
| class="label" | Mells || class="category" | Univallate hill fort ||   || || A promontory hill fort covering  surrounded by a bank and scarp.
| || style="vertical-align:center; text-align:center;"  || 

|- class="vcard without_image"
! scope="row" class="fn org" | Westbury Beacon, a bell barrow 720 m west of Brimble Pit Pool
| || style="vertical-align:center; text-align:center;"  || 

|- class="vcard without_image"
! scope="row" class="fn org" | Westbury Camp, slight univallate hillfort, 750 m north of Stokewood Cottage
| class="label" | Rodney Stoke || class="category" | Hill fort ||   || || Westbury Camp is a univallate Iron Age hill fort. The camp is largely situated in a hill slope. The north east defences has largely been destroyed by small quarries over the years. The narrow top of the hill bank suggests that it may have been surmounted by a dry stone wall. Along part of the east side of the camp there are traces of a berm between the bank and the outer ditch and at the western angle shallow quarry pits occur internally and externally set back from the 'rampart'.
| || style="vertical-align:center; text-align:center;"  || 

|- class="vcard with_image"
! scope="row" class="fn org" | Westbury village cross
| || || 

|- class="vcard without_image"
! scope="row" class="fn org" | Whatley Combe Roman villa
| class="label" | Nunney || class="category" | Earthworks ||   || || Earthworks from a multi-room Roman villa, with a bath suite, occupied during the 4th century.
| || style="vertical-align:center; text-align:center;"  || 

|- class="vcard with_image"
! scope="row" class="fn org" | Witham Priory
| class="label" | Witham Friary || class="category" | Monastery ||   || || Earthworks from a Carthusian monastery which was occupied between the 12th and 16th centuries.
| || || 

|- class="vcard with_image"
! scope="row" class="fn org" | World War II bombing decoy complex, anti-aircraft obstructions and Beacon Batch round barrow cemetery on Black Down
| class="label" | Priddy || class="category" | Earthworks ||   || || Earthworks from a World War II bombing decoy town. The decoy, known under the code name Starfish used fires of creosote and water to simulate incendiary bombs exploding. The site was home to a Z battery of anti aircraft rockets. Piles of stones (known as cairns) were also created to prevent enemy aircraft from using the hilltop as a landing site.
| || || 

|}

See also
 Scheduled Monuments in Somerset
 Grade I listed buildings in Mendip
 Grade II* listed buildings in Mendip

Notes

References

Scheduled monuments in Mendip District
Archaeological sites in Somerset
History of Somerset
Scheduled
Mendip